Anna Jane Mowbray (born July 1983) is a New Zealand entrepreneur and businessperson. Together with her brothers Mat and Nick, she leads the Chinese toy manufacturer ZURU; her role is chief operating officer. Using her contacts in China, she organised the delivery of personal protective equipment to New Zealand early on during the COVID-19 pandemic.

Early life
Mowbray grew up in Cambridge, New Zealand, and was educated at St Peter's School. Her parents owned a dairy farm in Cambridge.

ZURU
Her brothers relocated to Hong Kong in 2003 to set up a toy manufacturing company and soon moved to China. She joined them in China in 2005. First based in Guangzhou, the company was shifted to Shenzhen to be closer to Hong Kong (where international buyers come to) and because the Shenzhen workforce is more highly educated. As of 2020, Mowbray was ZURU's chief operating officer.

COVID-19 response
Mowbray relocated from Hong Kong to Coatesville north of Auckland in late January 2020 as schools had shut in Hong Kong due to the COVID-19 pandemic. Having experienced the rapid progression of the pandemic in China and Hong Kong, she publicly spoke out on 13 March 2020 and urged the New Zealand government to close the borders to all but returning residents. At the end of March, Mowbray foresaw that there would be a world shortage of personal protective equipment (PPE) and pulled together a team of ZURU staff based in New Zealand and China to procure product. She worked closely with Rob Fyfe, who was appointed by the New Zealand government to undertake business liaison. Several cargo planes chartered by ZURU from Air New Zealand started arriving in New Zealand from early April.

Private life
Mowbray has three children from her first marriage. Her children were first educated in Shenzhen and then in Hong Kong when she moved to there. Since 2019, she has been in a relationship with Ali Williams, a former All Black, who has two girls from his former marriage.

The Mowbray siblings bought Coatesville mansion in Coatesville in 2017 for NZ$32.5 million when they were in their early 30s. The mansion is one of New Zealand's most expensive homes and is famous for the January 2012 raid when Kim Dotcom lived there. According to the National Business Review, the net worth of the siblings is NZ$3bn.

In 2020, Mowbray and Williams bought a NZ$24m waterfront property in the Auckland suburb of Westmere; the house was previously owned by film maker Andrew Adamson.

References

New Zealand businesspeople
Businesspeople in manufacturing
New Zealand billionaires
People educated at St Peter's School, Cambridge
Living people
1983 births